Aleksandr Yakovlevich Potapov (5 May 1944 – 18 September 2011) was a Soviet sailor. He competed in the 470 event at the 1976 Summer Olympics.

References

External links
 
 

1944 births
2011 deaths
Soviet male sailors (sport)
Olympic sailors of the Soviet Union
Sailors at the 1976 Summer Olympics – 470
People from Dolgoprudny